USS Canary (AMc-25) was a coastal minesweeper acquired by the U.S. Navy for the dangerous task of removing mines from minefields laid in the water to prevent ships from passing.

World War II service 

Canary, formerly John G. Murley, was acquired by the Navy on 24 October 1940, and following conversion, was placed in service on 19 June 1941 in the 4th Naval District.

Reclassified YDT-7 tender 

On 10 January 1944 she was re-classified YDT-7 and thereafter attached to the 5th Naval District for assignment in connection with diving, torpedo, mine and antisubmarine programs.

Deactivation 

Canary was transferred to the Maritime Administration in June 1948.

References

External links 
 NavSource Online: Mine Warfare Vessel Photo Archive - Canary (AMc 25) / YDT-7

World War II minesweepers of the United States
Minesweepers of the United States Navy